Blitzkrieg is a military term describing the use of overwhelming force and rapid speed.

Blitzkrieg or Blitz Krieg or variation, may also refer to:

People
 Fabulous Blitzkrieg, professional wrestler also known as Blitzkrieg
 Blitzkrieg II, a stage name of professional wrestler Jack Evans
 Blitz Krieg (Andy Eastwood), a guitarist of The Count Bishops

Fictional characters
 Blitzkrieg (DC Comics), a comic book series
 Blitzkrieg (Marvel Comics), a comic book superhero

Groups, organizations, companies

Musical ensembles, bands, groups
 Blitzkrieg (metal band), an English heavy metal band
 Blitzkrieg (punk band), an English punk rock band
 Blitzkrieg, the first name of the German art-rock band later named Wallenstein and the name of their first LP
 Blitzkrieg, a former name for Therion
 Blitzkrieg, a former name for the German band Boskops

Fictional groups, teams
 Blitzkrieg Boys, the Russian team in the anime series Beyblade, known as the Demolition Boys in the show's first season
 Team Blitzkrieg, the German team in the film DodgeBall: A True Underdog Story (2004)

Arts, entertainment, media
 "Blitz Krieg" (episode), a 2000 TV episode of One Piece (season 1)

Games
 Blitzkrieg (video game series), a World War II computer game
 Blitzkrieg (video game), a 2003 real-time tactics computer game
 Blitzkrieg (game), a tabletop wargame published by Avalon Hill in 1965
 Scholar's mate, a chess beginner's blunder

Literature
 Blitzkrieg: From the Rise of Hitler to the Fall of Dunkirk, a book by Len Deighton and a computer game published by Ariolasoft in 1987

Music
 Blitzkrieg, an album by Wallenstein

Songs
 "Blitzkrieg", a 1981 song by English metal band Blitzkrieg, later covered by Metallica on Garage Inc.
 "Blitzkrieg Bop", a 1976 song by the punk rock band Ramones
 "Blitzkrieg" (song), a 1993 song by Excessive Force
 "Blitzkrieg", a song by Deathstars from their 2006 album Termination Bliss

Other uses
 The "Blitzkrieg", or "Overkill" hypothesis of the New World Pleistocene extinctions

See also

 Blitz campaign
 
 
 Blitz (disambiguation)
 Krieg (disambiguation)